St. Alban's Church, Forest Town is a parish church in the Church of England in Forest Town, Nottinghamshire.

History 

St. Alban's Church was built by the architect Louis Ambler. The foundation stone was laid by the William Cavendish-Bentinck, 6th Duke of Portland on 5 November 1910 by the Duke of Portland. and the church was consecrated by the Bishop of Southwell, Sir Edwyn Hoskyns, on 2 July 1911.

The north aisle was added at a cost of £1,400 and consecrated on 31 September 1937.

After a major fire in 1968, a restoration was carried out and the church re-opened in 1969.

Stained glass
There is a new east window installed in 1995.

Organ
A new organ by Brindley and Foster was installed in 1917 and dedicated on 18 March 1918 by the Bishop of Southwell.

Incumbents
 Revd Harry Bull 1911 - 24
 Revd Robert Percival Tinsley 1924 - 29
 Revd George Sprittles 1929 - 35
 Revd Percy Clegg 1935 - 42
 Revd Douglas Mortimer 1942 - 47
 Revd John Spencer 1947 - 55
 Revd Philip Walker 1955 - 64
 Revd Walter Beasley 1964 - 70
 Revd Leslie Standley 1970 - 76
 Revd A Parsons 1976 - 78
 Revd Ian Gibbs 1979 - 83
 Revd Robin Walford 1984 - 92
 Revd Robert Smith 1992 - 98
 Revd Philip Stead 1999 -

References

Church of England church buildings in Nottinghamshire
Churches completed in 1911